The Gare des Brotteaux is an old railway station located in the Brotteaux quarter, in the 6th arrondissement of Lyon.

History

Built by the Paris-Lyon-Méditerranée company (PLM), and especially by Parisian architect Paul d'Arbaut and engineer Victor-Louis Rascol, the station served the line to Ambérieu-en-Bugey and Geneva. Its style is almost the same as the Gare d'Orsay which was built at the same time. The first station, called Gare de Genève, was created in 1858, then was replaced by the current station, built in 1904 and inaugurated on 29 March 1908.

The new railway station

Since 1982, facades, roofs and the salle des pas perdus were classified as monuments historiques. The station closed on 13 June 1983, when the Gare de la Part-Dieu began to be used, because it would have to be renovated (to build new platforms, to solve traffic problems, access and parking of vehicles). The building for passengers kept its original decor with paintings by several artists, including Charles Lacour, Antoine Barbier and Clovis Terreire. The building was rehabilitated in 1988 by architect Yves Heskia. The same year, the station was sold by the SNCF and currently hosts the auction house of Jean-Claude Anaf, the Brasserie de l'Est by Paul Bocuse, the architectural workshop Arche, among other things.

In 2002, the monument was labeled heritage of the twentieth century.

The station was renovated between 2002 and 2006 for a total cost of 7.141 million euros.

Architecture
The architecture of the railway station consists of moving volumes, bay windows, plant motifs and art castings. Crests and mosaics are displayed on the facade.

References

Railway stations in Lyon
Defunct railway stations in Auvergne-Rhône-Alpes
6th arrondissement of Lyon
Railway stations in France opened in 1958
Monuments historiques of Lyon